Mexico Espanol Airplay is a record chart published weekly by Billboard magazine for Spanish language singles released in Mexico. According to Billboards electronic database, the first chart was published on January 17, 2009, with the track "Lo Que Yo Sé de Ti" by Mexican band Ha*Ash. In 2011, fellow Mexican duo Jesse & Joy reached the top of the chart with their single "¡Corre!", the first of their eight number-one singles in the chart, the most for any band. "¡Corre!" also won the Latin Grammy Awards for Record of the Year and Song of the Year in 2012. Starting on December 1, 2012, Mexican singer Thalía spent 10 non-consecutive weeks at number-one with "Manías", the first single from the album Habítame Siempre, which won the Lo Nuestro Award for Pop Album of the Year. "Hoy Tengo Ganas de Ti" by Mexican artist Alejandro Fernández and American singer Christina Aguilera reached number-one in 2013, and also peaked at number four in Spain.

In 2014, seven songs related to telenovelas reached number-one in the chart; "No Querías Lastimarme" by Mexican singer Gloria Trevi was included in the Colombian series ¿Quién mató a Patricia Soler?. "Corazones Invencibles" by Mexican singer-songwriter Aleks Syntek was featured as the main theme for the Mexican telenovela Lo que la vida me robó. Two songs by Mexican band Camila from their third studio album Elypse, were also used in telenovelas: "Decidiste Dejarme", for the Argentinian Telefe's Camino al amor, and "Perdón", for the Mexican Televisa's La malquerida. Chayanne's "Tu Respiración" was the music theme for the telenovela Lo imperdonable. Spanish singer Enrique Iglesias peaked at number one with the single "Bailando", which was featured in Telemundo's telenovela Reina de Corazones. The track also spent 41 consecutive weeks at the top of the Billboard Latin Songs chart in the United States and won the Latin Grammy Award for Song of the Year. The last number-one song of 2014, "Perdón, Perdón" by Mexican duo Ha*Ash, was Rastros de Mentiras main theme in Argentina.

In 2015, two songs reached number-one on both the Mexican Airplay Chart and the Latin Songs chart in the United States, "Ginza" by Colombian performer J Balvin and "El Perdón" by American artist Nicky Jam featuring and Enrique Iglesias.

Number ones

Artists with most number-one singles

Artists by total number of weeks at number one

References

Billboard charts
Lists of number-one songs in Mexico
Mexican record charts